5,7-Dihydroxytryptamine (5,7-DHT) is a purported neurotoxin used in scientific research to decrease concentrations of serotonin in the brain. The mechanism behind this effect is not well understood, but it is speculated to selectively destroy serotonergic neurons, in a manner similar to the dopaminergic neurotoxicity of 6-hydroxydopamine (6-OHDA). What is known is that this compound is in fact not selective in depleting serotonin content, but also depletes norepinephrine. To selectively deplete serotonin stores, it is commonly administered in conjunction with desmethylimipramine (desipramine), which inhibits the norepinephrine transporter.

See also 
 DSP-4
 6-Hydroxydopamine (6-OHDA)
 para-Chlorophenylalanine (PCPA)

References 

Neurotoxins
Tryptamines